Leucospermum cordifolium is an upright, evergreen shrub of up to 1½ m (5 ft) high from the Proteaceae. The flower heads are globe-shape with a flattened top,  in diameter, and are carried individually or with two or three together mostly at a right angle to its branch. The perianth is 3–3½ cm long, yellow, orange or crimson in color. From each flower emerges a 4½–6 cm (1.8–2.4 in) long style sticking out horizontally but curving upwards near the obliquely, shell-shaped, thicker pollen presenter. This gives each head the appearance of a pincushion. Its common name is ornamental pincushion in English and bobbejaanklou in Afrikaans. It flowers between the middle of July and the end of November. It naturally occurs near the south coast of the Western Cape province of South Africa. Varieties and hybrids of this species are used as cut flower and garden plant.

Description 
The flowering stems may be more or less erect or spreading  in diameter initially covered in short, fine, cringy hairs, which may go lost with age.

The common base is narrowly conical in shape with a pointy tip 3–3½ cm (1.2–1.4 in) long and ¾ cm (0.3 in) wide.

The perianth is 3–3½ cm long, yellow, orange or crimson in color. The three periant lobes at the side of the centre of the flowerhead remain united and form a hairless, rolled sheath, except for some rigid hairs on the margins. The lobe facing towards the rim of the flowerhead is free. The style is 4½–6 cm (1.8–2.4 in) long, sticking out horizontally but curving upwards near the obliquely shell-shaped pollen presenter, with a flattened tip that also contains an oblique groove that functions as the stigma.

The subtribe Proteinae, to which the genus Leucospermum has been assigned, consistently has a basic chromosome number of twelve (2n=24).

Differences with related species 
The ornamental pincushion can be distinguished by its spreading habit, with horizontal branches, leaf-shapes that range from oblong with teeth in the earliest growth of the season to entire and oval closer to the flower heads. The flower heads are generally at a right angle to the branch it grows from, on the peranth lobes are only some soft hairs and the pollen presenter has a skewed shell shape. The closely related L. patersonii is more tree-like, with larger, less variable, broadly oblong leaves that consistently have three to eight teeth near the tip, woolly perianth lobes and upright flower heads.

Taxonomy 
In 1809, Joseph Knight published a book titled On the cultivation of the plants belonging to the natural order of Proteeae, that contained an extensive revision of the Proteaceae attributed to Richard Anthony Salisbury. Salisbury was the first to describe the ornamental pincushion and named it Leucadendrum cordifolium. In 1900 however, his generic names were suppressed in favour of those proposed by Robert Brown. Robert Brown called the species Leucospermum nutans in 1810. In 1841, the French botanist Jean Poiret moved the species and made the combination Protea nutans. Otto Kuntze moved the species again, now to his genus Leucadendron, making the combination Leucadendron nutans in 1891. Kuntze's genus however is a later synonym of Leucospermum by Brown, and a later homonym of Leucadendron as proposed by Linnaeus. The species name proposed by Salisbury is the earliest and was not suppressed unlike his genus name. Edwin Percy Phillips described a slightly different form in 1910 and called it Leucospermum mixtum, while a third form was named Leucospermum bolusii, a later homonym of the name proposed by Michel Gandoger in 1901 for another species. Leucospermum integrifolium was described by Gandoger and Hans Schinz in 1913, and Leucospermum meisneri by Gandoger that same year. In 1932, Henry Georges Fourcade realised the new combination Leucospermum cordifolium needed to be made. John Patrick Rourke in 1970 considered all of these names synonyms of Leucospermum cordifolium.

L. cordifolium has been assigned to the showy pincushions, section Brevifilamentum.

The species name cordifolium is compounded from the Latin words cordis meaning "heart" and folium meaning "leaf", so heart-shaped leaf.

Distribution, habitat and ecology 
Leucospermum cordifolium can be found in a strip between Soetanysberg, Bredasdorp, Elim and Napier, Western Cape in the southeast, through Stanford, Caledon, Onrusrivier and Botrivier, to Aries Kraal in the northwest, in the foothills of the Kogelberg. Unlike close relative L. patersonii that is confined to limestone ridges, L. cordifolium can only be found on acid soils that derived from Table Mountain Sandstone. Groups or individuals
grow in open, hilly terrain at 30–450 m (100–1500 ft) in a fynbos vegetation that mostly consist of other Proteaceae, several Erica species and Restionaceae. Along its distribution area, the average annual precipitation is 625–1025 mm (15–40 in), which predominantly falls during the winter half year.

The ornamental pincushion is pollinated by birds. The ripe fruits fall to the ground about two months after flowering. Here these are collected by native ants that carry them to their underground nests. Here the seeds remain protected against fire, seed-eating rodents and birds. After a fire has cleared the vegetation cover, increased daily temperature fluctuations and chemicals from charred wood seeping to the seeds with the rain, promote germination and so revives the pincushion at these locations. Tests showed that germination is best with the temperature fluctuating daily between 9 and 24 °C, which corresponds to the micro climate during winter in its home range after the vegetation has been cleared.

References

External links 
 several photos

cordifolium
Endemic flora of South Africa
Plants described in 1809
Taxa named by Richard Anthony Salisbury